BZM may refer to:
 Biafra Zionist Movement, now Biafra Zionist Front
 Londo language (ISO 639 code 'bzm')
 A wireless station formerly operated by the Broadcasting Corporation of Newfoundland